Rudolph II (1552–1612) was a Holy Roman Emperor.

Rudolph II or Rudolf II may also refer to:
Rudolph II of Burgundy (died 937), king of Upper Burgundy, Lower Burgundy, and Italy
Rudolf II, Margrave of the Nordmark (d. 1144)
Rudolph II, Count of Habsburg (died 1232), Count of Habsburg
Rudolph II, Count Palatine of Tübingen (died 1247), Count Palatine of Tübingen and Vogt of Sindelfingen
Rudolf II, Duke of Austria (1270–1290), the youngest son of King Rudolph of Habsburg and Gertrude of Hohenburg
Rudolf II, Margrave of Baden-Baden (d. 1295)
Rudolf II, Margrave of Hachberg-Sausenberg (1301–1352)
Rudolf II, Count Palatine of the Rhine (1306–1353), Count Palatine of the Rhine
Rudolf II, Duke of Saxe-Wittenberg (c. 1307–1370), member of the House of Ascania